The 2020 Cork Premier Intermediate Football Championship was the 15th staging of the Cork Premier Intermediate Football Championship since its establishment by the Cork County Board in 2006. The draw for the group stage placings took place on 19 November 2019. The championship was scheduled to begin in April 2020, however, it was postponed indefinitely due to the 2020 coronavirus pandemic in Ireland. The championship eventually began on 25 July 2020 and, after being suspended once again on 5 October 2020, eventually ended on 1 August 2021.

The final was played on 1 August 2021 at Páirc Uí Chaoimh in Cork, between Knocknagree and Kanturk, in what was their first meeting in a final. Knocknagree won the match by 0-12 to 0-09 to claim their first ever championship title in the grade.

Knocknagree's Fintan O'Connor was the championship's top scorer with 0-28.

Format change

On 26 March 2019, three championship proposals were circulated to Cork club delegates. A core element running through all three proposals, put together by the Cork GAA games workgroup, was that there be a group stage of 12 teams and straight relegation and promotion. On 2 April 2019, a majority of 136 club delegates voted for Option A which will see one round of games played in April and two more in August – all with county players available.

Team changes

To Championship 
Promoted from the Cork Intermediate Football Championship

 Gabriel Rangers
 Knocknagree

From Championship 
Promoted to the Cork Senior A Football Championship

 Bandon
 Bantry Blues
 Béal Átha'n Ghaorthaidh
 Éire Óg
 St Michael's

Results

Group 1

Table

Results

Group 2

Table

Results

Group 3

Table

Results

Knock-out stage

Relegation playoff

Quarter-finals

Semi-finals

Final

Championship statistics

Top scorers

Overall

In a single game

Miscellaneous

 Aghada marked the passing of former player Kieran O'Connor by retiring their No.4 shirt for their first-round match against Castletownbere. O'Connor was also listed on the Aghada team sheet.

References

External link

 Cork GAA website

Cork Premier Intermediate Football Championship